Sidney Charles Rand (17 August 1934 – 25 December 2008) was an English rower who  competed for Great Britain at the 1956 Summer Olympics  and at the 1960 Summer Olympics. He won the Wingfield Sculls in 1954 and the Double Sculls Challenge Cup at Henley Royal Regatta in 1956.

Life and sport
Rand was born in Tottenham, the eldest of three children. He and his brother were evacuated during the Second World War to Northampton. After the war the family returned to Tottenham and Rand attended Down Lane School.  He started rowing on the River Lea in east London at the age of 14 where he sculled a Thames skiff until he was good enough for a fine boat.  He raced at various regattas such as the Norfolk Sculls in 1952 until, he joined the Royal Air Force on National Service that year. He was posted to RAF Benson, where as a corporal, he rowed for the RAF,  the force's rowing facilities being based with Wallingford Rowing Club across the River Thames.

In 1954 Rand won the Wingfield Sculls beating  Tony Fox and John Marsden and competed in the event nine times in his career.  He also won the first Scullers Head and was selected for the 1954 British Empire and Commonwealth Games in Vancouver, where he took silver. After completing his three years of National Service, Rand moved to Henley on Thames, where he joined Leander Club, working full-time for a Henley building firm. In 1955 he lost the final of the Diamond Challenge Sculls at Henley Royal Regatta, by a length and a half  to Teodor Kocerka, but in 1956 won the Double sculls with his brother Bill Rand.  They were selected for the 1956 Summer Olympics in Melbourne  where they were the fastest losers in the repechage. In 1960 Sid Rand competed in the single sculls at the 1960 Summer Olympics in Rome.

In 1961 Rand met Olympic long-jumper Mary Bignal and she accepted his marriage proposal shortly after they met. He supported her at the 1964 Summer Olympics where she won gold, silver and bronze. The marriage ended after five years.

After his international career, Rand turned to coaching at Upper Thames Rowing Club and Leander Club and spent time with the British squad at the end of the 20th century. In 1999 he coached Steve Williams and Simon Dennis to a win at the Silver Goblets at Henley. He continued to row and scull himself, competing regularly. He also resumed skiffing being a successful competitor at the Wargrave and Shiplake Regatta.

Rand died of cancer at the Royal Berkshire Hospital aged 74.

References

1934 births
2008 deaths
British male rowers
Olympic rowers of Great Britain
People from Tottenham
Rowers at the 1956 Summer Olympics
Rowers at the 1960 Summer Olympics
Rowers from Greater London
Commonwealth Games medallists in rowing
Commonwealth Games silver medallists for England
Rowers at the 1954 British Empire and Commonwealth Games
European Rowing Championships medalists
Medallists at the 1954 British Empire and Commonwealth Games